The Royal Ordnance L7, officially designated Gun, 105 mm, Tank, L7, is the basic model of the United Kingdom's most successful tank gun. It is a 105 mm L/52 rifled design by the Royal Ordnance Factories, intended for use in armoured fighting vehicles, replacing the older QF 20-pounder (84 mm) gun mounted on the British Centurion tank. The successful L7 gun has been fitted on many armoured vehicles, including the Centurion (starting from the Mk. 5/2 variant), the German Leopard 1 and (in an altered design, the M68 gun) several variants of the US M48 Patton and M60.

The L7 is a popular weapon and continued in use even after it was superseded by the L11 series 120 mm rifled tank gun, for some Centurion tanks operating as Artillery Forward Observation and Armoured Vehicle, Royal Engineers (AVRE) vehicles. The L7, and adaptations of it, can be found as standard or retrofitted equipment on a wide variety of tanks developed during the Cold War.

History

Both the United Kingdom and the United States had been developing projects for high calibre guns during WWII in order to compete with increasingly heavily armoured German tanks, and later for Cold War Soviet tanks. The US developed several heavy tank designs during this period, notable were the US 105 mm Gun Motor Carriage T95 (also known as "Super Heavy Tank T28") as well as the QF 32-pounder mounted on the British A39 Tortoise heavy assault tank.

The US foresaw difficulties in engagements against the Soviet IS-3 and 4 with its M47 Patton. This led to the introduction of the M103, a heavy tank designed to counter Soviet heavy tanks. It mounted an extremely powerful 120 mm cannon but the ammunition was so large that it required two loaders, one for the shell and another for the separate propellant charge. Of the 300 M103s built, most went to the Marines. The UK came to the same conclusions and developed their own heavy tank, the Conqueror, which mounted the L1 120 mm gun.

United Kingdom
During the Hungarian Revolution of 1956, a Soviet T-54A medium tank was driven onto the grounds of the British embassy in Budapest by the Hungarians in November. After a brief examination of this tank's armour and 100 mm gun, British officials decided that the 20-pounder was apparently incapable of defeating its frontal armour. This meant the most common British tanks were no longer able to effectively deal with Soviet medium tank designs, let alone their heavy tanks.

These events spurred the United Kingdom to employ a new high-velocity tank gun in 1958, the Royal Ordnance L7 to keep existing Centurion tanks viable against this new Soviet tank design. While the United States began design development of the XM60 tank in 1957 and began user trials of the weapon in 1958. The L7 was specifically designed to fit into the turret mountings of the 20 pounder. This would enable the Centurion tanks to be up-gunned with minimum modifications; hence, the fleet could be upgraded in a shorter time and at a lower cost. The first production tank to integrate the L7 was a single up-armoured Centurion Mark 7 in 1958 which was to prove the future viability of up-armouring and up-gunning the Centurion. From 1959 onwards newly built Centurions incorporated the L7 at production.

United States

The main gun for the M60 tank series was chosen after a comparative firing test of six different guns carried out on the Aberdeen Proving Ground in 1958. The factors evaluated were accuracy, the lethality of a hit, rate of fire, and penetration performance. Based on these tests, the 105 mm T254E1 was selected, modified to the T254E2 and standardized as the Cannon, 105-MM Gun, M68. The T254E2/M68 used a vertical sliding breechblock instead of the T254E1's horizontal breechblock. Until American-made barrels could be obtained with comparable accuracy, British X15/L52 barrels mounting a concentric bore evacuator on the barrel were to be used. US-built XM24/L52 barrels (length 218.5 inches) fitted with an eccentric bore evacuator were used for the M60-series starting in June 1959 but retained interchangeability with the British X15/L52 barrel. All of the US guns and XM24 barrels were produced at the Watervliet Arsenal in New York and the gun mounts (M116 for the M60 and M140 for the M60A1/A3) manufactured at the Rock Island Arsenal in Illinois. US M68 guns were fitted with an eccentric bore evacuator instead of a concentric model in order to provide more clearance over the rear deck of the tank. The original variant of the M60 tank was equipped with the M68 gun using the M116 mount. Additionally, many M48A3s armed with a 90mm gun that were in NG-CONUS service with the Army National Guard were retrofitted with the M68 gun and re-designated as the M48A5. This was done to maintain training levels of Guard units as well as using a commonality in ammunition amongst tanks.

The M60A1 and A3 variants of the M60 series and earliest pre-production XM1 prototypes of the M1 Abrams tanks are armed with the M68E1 variant of the gun.  The M68E1 gun shares the same firing characteristics as the M68. It featured several design improvements including an updated gun hydraulic configuration, a stabilization upgrade for the gun, a gun elevation kill switch for the loader, improved ballistic drive and other component refinements. They were fitted with thermal sleeves on the barrels starting in 1973.  During the mid 1970s it was becoming clear that the latest generation of composite based armor was impervious to tungsten carbide penetrators. Work was performed at the Department of Energy's Pacific Northwest National Laboratory to engineer development of depleted uranium as a penetrator material for future ammunition while the Armament Research and Development Command (ARRADCOM) was improving the performance of the 105mm M774 cartridge. The improved M833 round starting in 1983, also using a depleted uranium penetrator to keep the M68E1 gun viable against this improved armor. In 1975 an updated version of the gun, the T254E3 was designed, focusing on the use of chrome plating to improve accuracy. It was used to evaluate improvements to the gun's performance using discarding sabot ammunition. Two guns were built and underwent firing trials at Aberdeen and technical evaluations at the Watervliet Arsenal. Based on the results of these tests the shortcomings of plated bores and gun tubes were found to outweigh any advantage they might offer and the program dropped by May 1976.

In January 1978, a program was initiated to develop an enhanced version of the 105mm gun, the M68A1 as a possible alternate weapon for the M1 Abrams. had a higher chamber pressure, reinforced breech allowing the use of high-energy propellants. Although the M256 120mm smoothbore gun was chosen to be the main weapon of the M1 Abrams in 1979, the ammunition for the gun was still not fully developed, thus delaying its fielding until 1984. The early production versions of the M1 Abrams (M1 & IPM1) were armed with the M68A1 for two reasons. First was due to the large number of M60 Patton tanks with the M68E1 gun still in widespread US service in the 1980s and a large on-hand stockpile of 105mm munitions. Fitting the M1 with the M68A1 gun was viewed as an economical and practical solution that allowed for commonality in ammunition among the two types of tanks.  Secondly was the fact that the M68A1E2 could employ the newly developed M900A1 APFSDS depleted uranium round that had improved penetration performance in comparison to the M833. These early versions of the M1 Abrams were in active Army service until 1991 and with National Guard units until 1996.  M1s built after 1984 were armed with the 120mm M256 and designated the M1A1. Many earlier M1 and IPM1 tanks were refitted with the M256 and their designations changed to the M1A1.

The M1128 Stryker Mobile Gun System (MGS) carries the M68A1E4 105mm cannon. The principal function of the MGS is to provide rapid direct fire to support assaulting infantry. The cannon is mounted in a low-profile, fully stabilized turret integrated into the Stryker chassis. The M68A1E4 is based on the M68A1E2 105mm cannon's design. It has a sustained fire rate of six rounds per minute. The gun employs four types of cartridges. The M900A1 kinetic energy penetrator to destroy armored vehicles; the M456A2 high explosive anti-tank round to destroy thin-skinned vehicles and provide anti-personnel fragmentation; the M393A3 high explosive plastic round to destroy bunkers, machine gun and sniper positions, and breach openings in walls for infantry to access; and M1040 canister shot for use against dismounted infantry in the open. The M68A1E4 will be completely withdrawn from US service when the M1128 Mobile Gun System is retired by the end of 2022.

Other users
The gun was subsequently adopted for use on the German Leopard 1 (for which the L7A3 variant was developed). In addition, several countries have used the gun to improve the firepower of existing main battle tanks. Derivatives have even been mounted in Warsaw Pact-built T-54 and T-55 tanks in Israel, India, Egypt and Iraq, and Type 79 tanks in China.

Variants

UK models
 L7A1
Standard UK production variant.

 L7A2
L7A1 fitted with a thermal sleeve.

 L7A3
Variant for the (West) German Leopard 1 MBT. The upper rear corner of the breech block reduced in size so gun can be depressed without hitting the turret roof.

 L7A4
L7A3 fitted with an Ernest Leitz Canada muzzle reference sensor. Used by the Belgian Leopard 1A5 (BE) and Canadian Leopard C1.

 L7 LRF

Low Recoil Force (LRF) version of the L7 used by the Stingray light tank.

 Royal Ordnance 105mm IWS
A development by Royal Ordnance designated Improved Weapon System with an increased chamber pressure and a longer barrel length of L/63.4.

 FM K.4 Modelo 1L
Argentine Army's licence produced by Fabricaciones Militares in Argentina. Used on the TAM medium tank. Also designated as "105 mm FRT L51 Tank Gun".

Chinese models
Type 79/81/81A/83
Chinese produced L7. Licence procured from Austria.

 ZPL-79
Chinese licence-built designation for the L7A3 with replaceable indigenous thermal sleeve. Also known as Type 79. It was mounted on the Type 80 tank prototypes.

 ZPL-81/A
Modified Type 79. ZPL-81A has improved thermal sleeve. First seen on the Type 59-II tank.

 ZPL-83/A
Modified Type 81 with longer barrel and improved construct material. Also known as Type 83. It was fitted on the Type 59D1, Type 63HG, Type 79 tank and Type 88B tank.

 ZPL-94
Modified Type 83 with longer barrel at 62 caliber. Mounted on Type 59D tank and Type 88A tank.

 ZPL-98
Modified Type 83A rifled gun with an indigenous low recoil muzzle brake and lighter weight. It was mounted on the Type 63A amphibious tank. Also known as Type 98 rifled gun.

ZPL-98A
Modified Type 98 rifled gun, mounted on ZTD-05 and ZTL-11.

Other developments
GT-3
South African variant built by Denel for converting Centurion with 20-pounder gun into Olifant tanks. GT-3 retained the breach assemblies of 20-pounder paired with the modified copy of L7 barrel.

GT-7
South African variant built by Denel for the Olifant Mk1A and Rooikat 105. Incorporates a heavily modified recoil assembly.

Rheinmetall Rh-105 family
Multiple variants of 105 mm tank gun developed from L7 by Rheinmetall of Germany for commercial market. The family consisted of Rh 105-60, Rh 105-40, Rh 105-30, Rh 105-20, and Rh 105-11. The last two numbers on the designation denotes the gun recoil force in metric ton. The Rh 105-20 and -11 models were fitted with muzzle brake and intended to be mounted on light tanks and wheeled armored vehicles. The variants has been fitted as modification on various armored vehicles, such as Rh 105-30 on Spanish M47E2, Rh 105-20 on Ikv 91 and AMX-10 RC, and Rh 105-11 on MOWAG Shark.

L74
Swedish model built by Bofors for the Strv 103 using more sophisticated recoil assembly and a longer L/62 gun tube for increased muzzle-velocity and accuracy.

Usage

L7 variant 

Centurion: L7A1 cannon on late Centurion models and derivatives such as Olifant
Vickers MBT: Mark 1, Mark 3, and Mark 4 models
Vijayanta
Leopard 1: L7A3 cannon
Leopard 2AV: Some of the prototype fitted with L7A3
M48 Patton: in some upgraded variants
M48A2GA2: West German modification
Super M48: German modernization of M48A2 or M48A3
M48A5E: Spanish modification
M48A5T2: Turkish modification
Stingray light tank: LRF cannon
M41 Walker Bulldog: LRF cannon on M41 105 variant
LAV-600: LRF cannon
 T-54/55: in some upgraded variants
 Type 59-II: Chinese modification of T-54
 Type 59 Royal Ordnance: British modernization of Type 59
 Tiran-4Sh: Israeli modification of T-54, both L7 and M68 variants fitted
 Tiran-5Sh: Israeli modification of T-55, both L7 and M68 variants fitted
 T-55M3: Israeli modernization of T-54/55
 T-55 "Gulmohar": Indian modernization of T-55
 M-55S: Slovenian modernization of T-55
Charioteer: A single prototype up-gunned with L7 cannon
FV4401 Contentious: The only prototype was later up-gunned with L7 cannon
Panzer 58: Production model
Panzer 61
Panzer 68
TAM medium tank
Rooikat 105
TH-400 and TH-800

ZPL variant
T-54/55: ZPL-83 in some upgraded kits sold by China
Type 59: in some upgraded variants
Type 59-II: ZPL-79, ZPL-81
Type 59-IIA: ZPL-81A
Type 59D1: ZPL-83A
Type 59D: ZPL-94
Type 69: in some upgraded variants
Type 69-IIG: An upgraded Bangladeshi variant of Type 69 tank
Type 79: ZPL-83
Type 79-II: ZPL-83A
Type 80: ZPL-79
Type 85-I: ZPL-79
Type 85-II: ZPL-94
Type 88: ZPL-83A
Type 88A: ZPL-94
Type 62G: ZPL-98 modification
Type 63: in some upgraded variants
Type 63HG: ZPL-83A modification
Type 63A: ZPL-98
MMT-40: Myanmar-built light tank with WMA301 turret and gun
WMA301: Modified ZPL-94
ST-1: Modified ZPL-94
ST-2: Modified ZPL-94
ZTD-05: ZPL-98A
ZTL-11: ZPL-98A 
ZTQ-15: Modified ZPL-94

Related designs with compatible ammunition 

MB-3 Tamoyo III
EE-T1 Osório
OF-40
Strv 103
VT 1-1
M47 Patton: in some upgraded variants
M47E2: Spanish modification armed with a Rheinmetall RH-105/30 gun
M47 OTO: Italian modification armed with an OTO Melara 105mm/52 gun
Marder Medium Tank: Marder IFV armed with OTO Melara 105mm/52 gun
B1 Centauro: Italian wheeled armored vehicle with OTO Melara 105mm/52 gun
Type 16 Maneuver Combat Vehicle: Japanese wheeled armored vehicle with Japan Steel Works 105mm/52 gun

Specification (L7A1)
Calibre: 105 mm (4.13 in)
Cartridge: 105×617mmR
Barrel length: 52 calibres, 
Weight: 
Length: 
Rate of fire: 10 rounds per minute (maximum)
Range:

References

Bibliography 

 
 
 Starry, Donn A., General. "Mounted Combat In Vietnam." Vietnam Studies. Department of the Army. First printing 1978.
 Zaloga, Steven J. and Hugh Johnson (2004). T-54 and T-55 Main Battle Tanks 1944–2004. Oxford: Osprey. 

Cold War artillery of the United Kingdom
Tank guns of the United Kingdom
105 mm artillery
Military equipment introduced in the 1950s